Duganella radicis is a bacterium from the genus Duganella in the Oxalobacteraceae family which was isolated with Duganella sacchari from the rhizosphere of field-grown sugarcane.

References

External links
Type strain of Duganella radicis at BacDive -  the Bacterial Diversity Metadatabase

Burkholderiales
Bacteria described in 2013